may refer to:
 , a private university in Japan.

Places 
 , the historical name for Edo and Tokyo.
 , the Japanese historical name for Luoyang.
 , the fictional place in Kamen Rider Build.

See also 
 Toto (disambiguation)
 TOTO (disambiguation)